The Total Africa U-23 Cup of Nations (known as the CAF U-23 Championship until 2015) is the main international football competition for CAF nations, played by under 23 years old players. It is held every four years with the top three teams qualifying to the Olympic Games.

History
The tournament was founded in 2011. On 6 August 2015, the CAF Executive Committee decided to change the name of the tournament from the CAF U-23 Championship to the Africa U-23 Cup of Nations, similar to the senior's version, Africa Cup of Nations.

In July 2016, Total has secured an eight-year sponsorship package from the Confederation of African Football (CAF) to support 10 of its principal competitions. Due to this sponsorship, the Africa U-23 Cup of Nations is named "Total Africa U-23 Cup of Nations".

Results

Successful national teams

Participating nations

Legend

 – Champions
 – Runners-up
 – Third place
 – Fourth place
GS – Group stage
Q – Qualified

 — Hosts
 ×  – Did not enter
 •  – Did not qualify
 ×  – Withdrew before qualification
 — Withdrew after qualification
 — Disqualified after qualification

Results in the Olympics (2012-present)

See also
 Africa Cup of Nations
 Africa U-20 Cup of Nations
 Africa U-17 Cup of Nations
 Football at the African Games
 Football at the Summer Olympics

References

External links
 
 African Youth Championship (rsssf.com)

 
U-23 Cup of Nations
Under-23 association football
U-23 Cup of Nations